Furuya (written: 古谷 or 古屋) is a Japanese surname. Notable people with the surname include:

, Japanese politician
, Japanese ice hockey player
, Japanese businessman in Hawaii
, Japanese American banker, merchant and businessman
, Japanese actress, singer and gravure idol
, Japanese manga artist
, Japanese manga artist
, Japanese racing driver
, Japanese politician
, Japanese biathlete
, Japanese photographer
, Japanese baseball player
, Japanese critic
, Japanese narrator and voice actor
, Japanese manga artist

See also
13815 Furuya, an outer main-belt asteroid

Japanese-language surnames